Hugh Vincent Moxey (27 September 1909, Somerset, – 9 March 1991, Wandsworth), was a British film and television actor. Moxey spanned his career for 40 years, where he was best remembered in supporting roles in 1950s British war films, including classics such as The Dambusters and Sink the Bismarck!.

Filmography
see

Richard of Bordeaux (1947, TV Movie) as Henry, Earl of Derby
He That Should Come (1948, TV Movie) as Centurion
Meet Simon Cherry (1949) as Simon Cherry
The Little Minister (1950, TV Movie) as Cpt. Halliwell
Sunday Night Theatre (1950-1955, BBC TV Series) as Capt. Pfundmayer / Mr. Goddard / Captain Halliwell
The Franchise Affair (1951) as Counsel for the Prosecution
Angels One Five (1952) as the Intelligence officer
Derby Day (1952) as Police Constable (uncredited)
The Yellow Balloon (1953) as Police Constable (uncredited)
Spaceways (1953) as Col. Alfred Daniels
The Good Die Young (1954) as Doctor at Baths (uncredited)
Conflict of Wings (1954) as Mr Ruddle
The Harassed Hero (1954) as Willis
Burnt Evidence (1954) as Assistant Commissioner
The Night My Number Came Up (1955) as Wing Commander
The Dambusters (1955) as Observer
The Gold Express (1955) as 'Morning Echo' Editor (uncredited)
Josephine and Men (1955) as the Police Inspector
The Adventures of the Big Man (1956, TV Series) as Greenward
My Teenage Daughter (1956) as Police Officer in Patrol Car (uncredited)
Scotland Yard (film series) ('The Case of the River Morgue', episode) (1956) as Inspector O'Madden
Assignment Redhead (1956) as Sgt Tom Coutts
White Hunter (TV series) (1957) as Purley
You Pay Your Money (1957) as Tom Cookson
Brothers in Law (1957) as Golf Club Secretary
Kenilworth (1957, TV Series) as Lord Burleigh
Time Without Pity (1957) as the Prison Governor
Not Wanted on Voyage (1957) as the First Officer
Saturday Playhouse (1958, TV Series) as Gilbert Baize the gillie
The Silent Enemy (1958) as Royal Navy Captain (uncredited)
Television Playwright (1958, TV Series) as Mr Wagland
ITV Play of the Week (1958, TV Series) as Dr Emmett
The Verdict Is Yours (1958, TV Series)
Dial 999 (TV series) (1958-'59) as various characters, in five episodes
Bobbikins (1959) as Chairman of the Special Committee (uncredited)
Sink the Bismarck! (1960) as Captain - Second Destroyer (uncredited)
On Trial (1960, TV Series) as Wyatt Williams
Danger Man (1960, TV Series) as Sir Arthur Lindsay
The Snake Woman (1961) as police inspector
Stryker of the Yard (1963, TV Series)
Twisted Nerve (1968) as Tom - Durnley's Friend (uncredited)
Mr. Forbush and the Penguins (1971) as Lord Cheddar
The Main Chance (1972, TV Series) as Judge Belling
Hennessy (1975) as Stephen Burgess M.P.
The Onedin Line (1976, TV Series) as Sam Bell
Plain Murder (1978, TV Movie) as Reddy's father
Matilda's England (1979, TV Series) as Major Sewell
A Question of Guilt (1980, TV Series) as Rev Stevens
Omen III: The Final Conflict (1981) as the butler
The Plot to Murder Lloyd George (1982, TV Movie) as Sir Hugo Young
Strangers and Brothers (1984, TV Series) as Speaker of the House of Commons
The Pickwick Papers (1985, TV Series) as a gentleman

References

External links

Rotten Tomatoes profile

1909 births
1991 deaths
Male actors from Bristol
British male film actors
British male television actors
20th-century British male actors